Dina Haroun (born 24 December 1973 – 8 October 2018) was a Syrian TV actress. Haroun started her acting career in Yasser al-Azma's hugely-successful series Maraya in 2000. In 2011, she left the cast of an Egyptian series, Al Hareba, due to a disagreement with the production company, and announced she was to play a lead in a new series, Ayam El Derasa, in which she plays a teacher that ends up having a student who falls in love with her.

Her sister, Tulai Haroun, is also an actress.

Filmography
Ayam El Derasa
Al Hareba
Nisaa Min Al Badyah
Maraya
Saqf al-Alam

References

1973 births
2018 deaths
Syrian television actresses
People from Latakia
20th-century Syrian actresses
21st-century Syrian actresses
Syrian Alawites